Stanford Township may refer to the following townships in the United States:

 Stanford Township, Clay County, Illinois
 Stanford Township, Isanti County, Minnesota